Island Lake State Recreation Area is a state-run park in Green Oak Township, Livingston County, in metro Detroit in Michigan.  The  park lies on the Huron River and Kent Lake, an impoundment of the river, just downstream of Kensington Metropark with which it is also connected by a bike trail. It is the third busiest park operated by the Michigan Department of Natural Resources with visitation of 1.09 million in 2008. The park is easily accessed as it lies near the intersection of I-96 and US-23.  The park has a group campsite and a canoe-in campsite, several miles of hiking and biking trails, a shooting range, swimming and a couple of small lakes. It is the only Michigan park to have a hot air balloon launch area.

References

External links
Island Lake Recreation Area, Michigan Department of Natural Resources
Island Lake Recreation Area Protected Planet (World Database on Protected Areas) 

Protected areas of Livingston County, Michigan
Huron River (Michigan)
State recreation areas of Michigan